Roland Bondonny (May 1932, Meymac – February 2005) was a wealthy vintner and conservative politician who lived in France, in Égletons in Corrèze and also in Fourmies in Nord. He poisoned 144 pets between 1997 and 2001. Bondonny had fed them meatballs contaminated with insecticide. He hired Alain Bodchon to kill Marius Lac, a witness for the prosecution in the case against Bondonny.  Marius Lac's body was found dead in his garage, his body hidden under a wheelbarrow. on August 25, 2004. Shortly before he was to appear in court in February 2005, he committed suicide.

References

1932 births
2005 suicides
People from Corrèze
French murderers
French winemakers
French politicians
Animal cruelty incidents
Suicides in France